Faore is an island of the Sikaiana atoll in the Malaita Province, Solomon Islands in the South Pacific. The local name is Matuiloto.

Geography
Faore is one of four islands of Sikaiana, a remote tropical coral atoll. Faore lies in the middle of the western end of the atoll and is reported to be the second in size after the Sikaiana island. The other islands of the atoll are Tehaolei (north), Sikaiana (east), and Matuavi (south).

References

External links
 

Islands of the Solomon Islands